Lingbao railway station is a railway station of Longhai railway located in Lingbao, Sanmenxia, Henan, China.

History 
The station was opened in 1927.

References 

Railway stations in Henan
Stations on the Longhai Railway
Railway stations in China opened in 1927